The Minnesota Court of Appeals is the intermediate appellate court in the U.S. state of Minnesota. It began operating on November 1, 1983.

Jurisdiction
The Court of Appeals has jurisdiction over most appeals from the state trial courts, including the Minnesota District Courts, and from many decisions of state agencies and local governments. The only exceptions to this grant of jurisdiction are statewide election contests, first-degree murder cases, and appeals from the Minnesota Tax Court and Minnesota Workers' Compensation Court of Appeals, all of which go directly to the Minnesota Supreme Court.

The Minnesota Supreme Court has discretionary review. Only about five percent of Court of Appeals decisions are accepted by the Supreme Court for further review, meaning that the Court of Appeals makes the final ruling in the vast majority of the 2,000 to 2,400 appeals filed every year.

Procedure
Under Minnesota law, the Court of Appeals must issue a decision within 90 days after oral arguments. If no oral argument is held, a decision is due within 90 days of the case's scheduled conference date. This deadline is the shortest imposed on any appellate court in the nation. The court expedites decisions on child custody cases, mental health commitments and other matters in which the parties request accelerated response.

Composition
The 19 judges of the Minnesota Court of Appeals are elected to renewable six-year terms. When a midterm vacancy occurs, the governor appoints a replacement to a term that ends after the general election occurring more than one year after the appointment. All judges that have ever served on the court have been appointed by the governor. The chief judge is selected by the governor from amongst the members of the court to serve a fixed three-year term.

Eight seats are associated with Minnesota's congressional districts. Judges for those seats must live in the associated district at the time of appointment or initial election. However, seated judges remain eligible for those positions even if they move to another district later on. Remaining seats are at-large positions that can be filled without regard to residency. The seats associated with congressional districts are redesignated every ten years following reapportionment of the districts. The most recent reapportionment occurred in 2012. The seats on the Court of Appeals were redesignated in January 2013.

Members sit in three-judge panels in various locations throughout the state to hear oral arguments, all of which are open to the public.

Members

Chief judges
 Peter Popovich (1983–1987)
 D.D. Wozniak (1987–1992)
 Paul Anderson (1992–1994)
 Anne Simonett (1994–1995)
 Edward Toussaint (1995–2010)
 Matthew Johnson (2010–2013)
 Edward Cleary (2013–2020)
 Susan Segal (2020–present)

Former judges
 Barry Anderson
 Paul Anderson
 Margaret Chutich
 Sam Hanson
 Natalie Hudson
 David Minge
 Fred Norton
 Randolph W. Peterson
 Peter Popovich
 Robert A. Randall
 John Rodenberg
 Larry Stauber
 Terri Stoneburner
 Edward Toussaint
 Wilhelmina Wright

References

External links
 

Minnesota state courts
State appellate courts of the United States
1983 establishments in Minnesota
Courts and tribunals established in 1983